Hector is an unincorporated community in Putnam County, in the U.S. state of Ohio.

History
Hector was platted in 1882, and named for Hector Havemeyer, proprietor. A post office was established in 1883, and remained in operation until it was discontinued in 1900. Hector contained a stave factory, but the town's prospects ended once the surrounding forests (and wood supply) were depleted.

References

Unincorporated communities in Putnam County, Ohio
Unincorporated communities in Ohio